Shakuntala A. Bhagat (6 February 1933 – 14 October 2012), born Shakuntala Joshi, was the first woman civil engineer in India.

Early life 
Shakuntala Joshi was the daughter of bridge engineer S. B. Joshi (1906–1991).

In 1953, she became the first woman to earn a civil engineering degree at Veermata Jijabai Technological Institute in Mumbai. She earned a master's degree in civil and structural engineering at the University of Pennsylvania.

Career 
Bhagat was assistant professor of civil engineering and head of the Heavy Structures Laboratory at the Indian Institute of Technology in Mumbai for much of the 1960s.  In 1970, she and her husband founded their own firm, Bhagat Engineering; they also founded Quadricon, a bridge construction firm specializing in a patented prefabricated modular design. She worked on design and construction of hundreds of bridges around the world, including projects in the United States, Germany, and the United Kingdom. She worked on concrete research for the Cement and Concrete Association of London. 

Bhagat was a member of the Indian Road Congress and a fellow of India's Institute of Engineers. In 1972, the Bhagats received an award from the Invention Promotion Board, for their Unishear connectors. In 1993, she was recognized as the Woman Engineer of the Year.

Personal life 
Shakuntala Joshi married fellow civil engineer Anirudha Shivprasad Bhagat. She died in 2012, aged 79.

References 

1933 births
2012 deaths
Indian civil engineers
Indian women engineers
Bridge engineers
Academic staff of IIT Bombay